Kianoush "Kia" Rahmati (born September 18, 1978 in Iran) is an Iranian football manager, former professional footballer.

Club career
He started his appearance in IPL in 2005 and moved to Saipa from Pas in 2007. He moved to Esteghlal in July 2009. He returned to Saipa in summer 2013. He later was loaned out to Mes Kerman and in June 2014 at the age of 35 he declared his retirement after suffering from a series of injuries.

Club career statistics
Last Update  7 December 2013 

 Assist Goals

International career
In October 2006, he was called up to join Team Melli in an LG cup tournament held in Jordan. He made his debut for Iran on October 4 in a match against Iraq.
Rahmati scored his first international goal against Palestine on August 7, 2008 in the 2008 West Asian Football Federation Championship.

International goals
Scores and results list Iran's goal tally first.

Honours

Club
Iran Pro League
Winner: 1
2012–13 with Esteghlal
Runner up: 2
2005–06 with Pas
2010–11 with Esteghlal
Hazfi Cup
Winner: 1
2011–12 with Esteghlal
Runner up: 1
2013–14 with Mes Kerman

References

Iran Pro League Stats

کیانوش رحمتی از فوتبال خداحافظی کرد

External links
 

1978 births
Living people
Iranian footballers
Iran international footballers
Association football midfielders
Pas players
Esteghlal F.C. players
Saipa F.C. players
People from Nowshahr
Sportspeople from Mazandaran province